World Briefing is BBC World Service's longtime news strand. It had broadcast roughly more than 13,000 unique episodes. Along with The World Today, Newshour, World Update and World: Have Your Say, it covered a large part of the schedule (four hours each weekday). It was broadcast on the hour as a half-hour programme whenever other news strands are not on air. Each individual version of the BBC World Service opted in or out of various editions. Public radio stations around the world also broadcast various editions of World Briefing.

On 25 March 2013, BBC World Service announced that World Briefing would be cancelled and replaced by The Newsroom. The Newsroom first aired on 1 April 2013 at 11am GMT. Unlike World Briefing, The Newsroom airs daily on a less frequent basis (only up to 6 times per day).

Presenters 
The presenters were:
 David Bamford
 Oliver Conway
 Frederick Dove
 Jackie Leonard
 Andrew Peach
 Valerie Sanderson
 Maddy Savage
 Doreen Walton

See also

 BBC World Service, the home of World Briefing
 BBC News
 BBC World News, The BBC's International Television Station

References

External links

BBC World Service programmes
BBC news radio programmes